Chief George Colbert, also known as Tootemastubbe in Chickasaw (c. 1764–1839), was a leader and war chief of the Chickasaw people in the early 19th century, then occupying territory in what are now the jurisdictions of Alabama and Mississippi. During the Creek War of 1813–1814, he commanded 350 Chickasaw auxiliary troops, whom he had recruited, as a militia captain under Andrew Jackson.  Later he joined the US Army under Jackson for the remainder of the War of 1812.

Colbert temporarily became an overall chief of the Chickasaw, succeeding his older brother Levi Colbert who died in 1834. Colbert was a planter who owned significant cotton lands in Mississippi and numerous enslaved African Americans to work them. He also owned and operated a ferry across the Tennessee River in northwestern Alabama.

His father, James Logan Colbert, was half Scots-Irish, half Chickasaw. Colbert's mother was Chickasaw, so Colbert and his siblings were three-quarters Chickasaw and one quarter Scottish by ancestry.

Early life and education
George Tootemastubbe Colbert was born in 1764 in present-day Alabama (then part of the Chickasaw Nation territory). He was the second of six sons of James Logan Colbert and his second wife Minta Hoye, a Chickasaw woman. Because the elder Colbert was also mixed-race, son of a Scots settler and his Chickasaw wife, his sons with Minta Hoye were three-quarters Chickasaw. These people were one of what the European Americans called the Five Civilized Tribes in the American Southeast.

The tribe practiced matrilineal kinship, and all children were considered to be born into their mother's family and clan, and gained their status from her. Property and positions of hereditary leadership were passed through the mother's line. Minta Hoye's clan was one from which hereditary chiefs were drawn. As a youth George Colbert began to rise in prominence among the Chickasaw, as he also gained status by his bravery in battle and other actions.

Military service
Colbert was said to serve with American troops under Arthur St. Clair in 1791 and Anthony Wayne in 1794 during the Northwest Indian Wars. During the Creek Wars of the early 19th century, he recruited 350 Chickasaw warriors and assisted Andrew Jackson against the Red Sticks, the more conservative portion of the people. Later he also led Chickasaw warriors against British forces during the War of 1812.

Career
By the early 1800s, George Colbert, also known as Tootemastubbe in Chickasaw, established Colbert's ferry near Cherokee, Alabama. It was a significant crossing of the Tennessee River along the Natchez Trace, an important trade route.  Colbert acquired land and became an influential cotton planter; he also raised livestock and was a trader. Due to his clan, he was eligible for the position of Chief. The Chickasaw communally owned an estimated 150 enslaved Africans as labor on their lands, as was custom with many intercultural tribes in the region.  A few slaves escaped during the confusion of the eventual Trail of Tears.

Colbert and his brothers, Levi (older) and the younger James, were among the primary negotiators between his people and the United States government in the early 19th century. The Chickasaw ended up ceding much of their land to the United States after Levi "Itawambamingo" Colbert had died en route to Washington D.C during negotiations in 1834. Having grown up with both Chickasaw and "white" language and culture, the Colbert brothers were strongly relied upon to act on the tribe's behalf. After Levi died, their negotiations abruptly ceased. In 1834, most of the Chickasaw joined members of other Southeast tribes in forced removal to Indian Territory (now Oklahoma) west of the Mississippi River. This removal became known among the Indians as the Trail of Tears. Itawamba County in Mississippi is named after Levi Colbert.

Before removal, George Tootemastubbe Colbert served again temporarily as chief of the Chickasaw. The year 1834 was the beginning of the forced removal process, accomplished by overland march and travel by rivers. Most of it took place in the later 1830s. Tishomingo became chief of the Chickasaw when they started on the trail and led the people until his death in 1838 en route, near the Arkansas River. Neither he nor Colbert, who died en route in 1839 at age 75, reached the new Chickasaw territory. Colbert/Tootemastubbe died at Fort Towson (which is in Choctaw territory east of the Chickasaw reserve) just before the people reached their new territory.

Marriage and family
Colbert married two times.  The women were sisters from the Wind Clan Cherokee; their father was Chief Doublehead. Colbert first married Tuskiahooto. When she proved to be barren, he also married  Saleechie, the younger sister. (The Chickasaw allowed the men in the tribe to marry multiple wives, per tribal law). Colbert fathered a total of six sons and two daughters. He never reached the Chickasaw section of Oka Homa.

Grandfather's family
His father, James Logan Colbert, was the son of Mimey (also known to settlers as "Dorothy"), daughter of a Chickasaw chief, and her husband William d'Blainville Piomingo Colbert (born 1695, Blainville-sur-Orne, France, although he was of Scottish descent (see Addendum section below). Such interracial marriages were considered advantageous by both sides; William Colbert was a trader and had better access to the tribes because of his wife's status, and her clan benefited by close relations with the trader. In 1786, soon after the American Revolutionary War and late in life, William Colbert received a commission as a Major from President George Washington. His grandson, General William "Chootshemataha" Colbert, also received a commission that year, and no doubt could contribute more to warfare needs. After William Colbert's death about 1792, his body was shipped overseas for burial on the Isle of Skye.

(Look up Chief Piomingo, Major William d'Blainville Colbert; Blainville-sur-Orne, France; Chateau d'Colbert in Blainville; Jacobite Uprisings; Massacre of Glencoe.)

Addendum: (William "d'Blainville" Colbert is so called since he was one of the first of the Castlehill Colberts of Inverness to be born outside Scotland in Blainville-sur-Orne, France, in 1695. The Chateau de Colbert is located in Blainville. It was once owned by the deceased Jean-Baptiste Colbert, a cousin, who had served as King Louis XIV's Treasurer in the mid-1600s. The Colberts/Cuthbert's of Castlehill, Inverness, had left Scotland because of the original Jacobite uprising, and the Glorious Revolution, known for the Massacre of Glencoe in their country. This had ousted Roman Catholic King James II of England and VII of Scotland to be replaced finally in 1692 by his Protestant daughter Mary II and William of Orange. The Jacobite Uprisings of 1689-1692 resulted in the deaths of 30 members of the Clan MacDonald of Glencoe, who were also close to King James. The "King Baron" Colberts fled to France for sanctuary in a Catholic country. They had intermarried with the Catholic Stuart family.

Chief George "Tootesmastube" Colbert circa 1830

Chateau de Colbert in Blainville-Sur-Orne, France

, representing Colbert family ownership of their chateau. Unicorns are Scotland's National "Animal"; the blue is similar to St. Andrews Flag of Scotland

Colbert Scottish Coat of Arms during Jacobite Uprisings

Legacy
Numerous place names commemorate George and/or Levi Colbert:
Colbert County, Alabama was named after the Chickasaw chiefs Levi and George Colbert. 
George's Cave was named after George Colbert. It is near Colbert's Spring (named after Levi).
Itawamba County, Mississippi was named after Levi Colbert (a shortened version of his Chickasaw name).   
Colbert, Oklahoma was named generally after the family in recognition of their contributions and Chickasaw blood ties. The small town is near the Texas border in the Red River Valley.  It was not a tribal seat in Indian Territory, such as what are now Ada and Ardmore, Oklahoma.

See also
 Chief Piominko, Chickasaw leader and diplomat

References

Further reading
Arrell M. Gibson, The Chickasaws (Norman: University of Oklahoma Press, 1971). 
Don Martini, Who Was Who Among the Southern Indians: A Genealogical Notebook  (Falkner, Miss.: N.p., 1997).

External links
 "Colbert, George", Encyclopedia of Oklahoma History and Culture

1760s births
1839 deaths
18th-century Native Americans
19th-century Native Americans
United States Army personnel of the War of 1812
American militia officers
American militiamen in the War of 1812
American people of Scottish descent
Chickasaw people
Native American leaders
Native American slave owners
People from Colbert County, Alabama
People of the Creek War
United States Army officers